Mowai is a village in Jalandhar district of Punjab State, India. It is located 13 km from Phillaur, 45 km from district headquarter Jalandhar and 124 km from state capital Chandigarh. The village is administrated by a sarpanch who is an elected representative of village as per Panchayati raj (India).

Demography 
According to the report published by Census India in 2011 , Mowai has a total number of 189 houses and population of 831 of which include 418 males and 413 females. Literacy rate of Mowai is 72.32%, lower than state average of 75.84%. The population of children under the age of 6 years is 58 which is 6.98% of total population of Mowai, and child sex ratio is approximately 933 higher than state average of 846.

Most of the people are from Schedule Caste which constitutes 34.66% of total population in Mowai. The town does not have any Schedule Tribe population so far.

As per census 2011, 277 people were engaged in work activities out of the total population of Mowai which includes 239 males and 38 females. According to census survey report 2011, 86.64% workers describe their work as main work and 13.36% workers are involved in marginal activity providing livelihood for less than 6 months.

Transport 
Bilga railway station is the nearest train station 1.5 km only. And second Partabpura railway station is the nearest train station however, Phillaur Junction train station is 12.8 km away from the village. The village is 44 km away from domestic airport in Ludhiana and the nearest international airport is located in Chandigarh also Sri Guru Ram Dass Jee International Airport is the second nearest airport which is 138 km away in Amritsar and Mowai has its own small bus stand from where you can take direct bus to Delhi and other cities.

References 

Villages in Jalandhar district